Woodlore is a studio album by saxophonist Phil Woods' Quartet. It was recorded in 1955 and released on the Prestige Records.

Reception

In his review for AllMusic, Scott Yanow stated "The altoist displays plenty of energy and a strong command of the bebop vocabulary, sounding quite enthusiastic".

Track listing
All compositions by Phil Woods except as indicated
 "Woodlore" - 5:23
 "Falling in Love All Over Again" (Neil Hefti) - 4:44
 "Be My Love" (Sammy Cahn, Nicholas Brodszky) - 5:38
 "Slow Boat to China" (Frank Loesser) - 5:04
 "Get Happy" (Harold Arlen, Ted Koehler) - 6:46
 "Strollin' With Pam" - 5:20

Personnel
Phil Woods - alto saxophone 
John Williams - piano
Teddy Kotick - bass 
Nick Stabulas - drums

References

Prestige Records albums
Phil Woods albums
1956 albums
Albums recorded at Van Gelder Studio
Albums produced by Bob Weinstock